Ghent  is an unincorporated community in central Bath Township, Summit County, Ohio, United States. It lies in the area of Granger and Cleveland-Massillon roads, just north of the Ghent Road exit of Interstate 77. It is included in the Montrose-Ghent census-designated place.

Today, it has a number of local businesses such a gas station, restaurants, a bakery and dental office.

History
As early as 1815, the village of Ghent had several mills powered by Yellow Creek. Several families had settled at Ghent by 1818. A post office called Ghent was established in 1858, and remained in operation until 1918. The community's name most likely commemorates the Treaty of Ghent.

References

Unincorporated communities in Summit County, Ohio
Unincorporated communities in Ohio